The Town Hall in Bulandshahr, India, was built by Muhammad Baquar Ali Khan at a cost of Rs. 30,000 in the late 19th century. The project was overseen by Frederic Growse, a British civil servant of the Indian Civil Service, who had been appointed collector of the region in 1878.  It is situated in Moti Bagh, which was created as a public garden. The main approach is via the Garden Gate. it was built in 1883.

Entrance

The main approach is via the Garden Gate.

2023

See also
Bulandshahr; or, Sketches of an Indian district; social, historical and architectural (1884)

References

Further reading

External links
Frederic Salmon Growse: The Man that built Bulandshahr in the 19th Century

Buildings and structures in Uttar Pradesh
Bulandshahr